Svitlana Kryukova (born 28 February 1984) is a Ukrainian journalist and first deputy editor-in-chief of the Strana.ua online publication. She is creator of the books Setka, Diary of Euromaidan, Revolution through the Eyes of Reporter's Journalists, and Chronicles of the Revolution. Also she known as the author of paintings in the genre of political satire. She is included in the top 100 most influential women in Ukraine according to Focus magazine.

Early life 

She was born February 28, 1984, in Kyiv. She graduated from the philological department of the specialized Kyiv lyceum Naukova zminna.

In 2001—2006 she studied at the Kyiv National Economic University (the faculty of finance and economics). Master of Finance.

Journalist career 

She began her career in journalism as an economic journalist specializing in public finance and economic policy.

At the end of 2004, the first Ukrainian business daily, Ekonomicheskie Izvestiya, launched in Ukraine, where Kryukova began her career as an intern in the Public Policy department. She worked there for three years as a correspondent, columnist, and special correspondent.

In 2006 she began working for the newspaper Komentarii. In the same period she began working with the Ekonomichna Pravda and Ukrayinska Pravda newspapers as a freelance journalist. Afterwards she briefly interrupted her career and went to the United States to work in fashion projects. During the same period he is interning in New York and Washington within the program “Journalism of the Digital Future”.

Since 2009, she has been a special correspondent for the magazine Expert-Ukraine, published under license of the Russian magazine of the same name.

In 2010–2012, she was deputy editor-in-chief of Expert-Ukraine magazine and editor of the Economic Policy section.

From 2013 to 2015, she headed the “Economics” section of Vesti Reporter, part of the Multimedia Invest Group holding. The journalist left the publication in the summer of 2015 following the resignation of the head of the holding and head of the Vesti newspaper Ihor Guzhva, who called himself the owner of the media holding. One of the reasons for her departure was the magazine's failure to publish her report about the electoral struggle in Chernihiv between Hennadiy Korban and Serhiy Berezenko, which was later published on the website of Ukrainska Pravda. The chief editor of the magazine Gleb Prostakov explained the non-issue by the fact that the editor's article was public relations. According to Kryukova, the material was not published in Vesti Reporter because of the negative assessment of Berezenko and the Presidential Administration in it, as well as the sharp change in the editorial policy of the holding after the dismissal of Ihor Huzhva.

In late 2015, Kryukova, along with a number of former employees of Multimedia Invest Holding joined the Strana.ua online newspaper launched by Ihor Huzhva. In the new edition, she took the position of first deputy editor-in-chief.

From March to August 2016, Svitlana Kryukova, together with Sevgil Musayeva, chief editor of the website Ukrainska Pravda, conducted a series of special interviews “Black and White”.

From 2016 to 2017, together with Ihor Huzhva, she was the host of the program “Subjective Results of Friday with Strana.ua” on the TV channel NewsOne.

In March 2019 Svitlana Kryukova released her book Setka which tells the story of Ukrainian politics over the past five years. The book gathered many reviews and feedbacks from Ukrainian politicians, journalists and political technologists. Editor-in-chief of Strana.ua Ihor Guzhva, former head of the UKROP party Hennadiy Korban, political technologist Dmytro Raimov, politician Maksym Buzhanskyi, journalist Aliona Yakhno and others commented on the book.

In July 2021, on her page in the social network Facebook, Svitlana Kryukova sharply criticized the article of the Kremlin head Vladimir Putin On the Historical Unity of Russians and Ukrainians. The journalist in her post analyzed Putin's theses, which she called “terrestrial propaganda” with a lot of unreliable and false information in the assessment of Ukrainian history. According to Kryukova, Ukraine has a historical chance for development, which can be hindered by the aggressive policy of the Russian authorities aimed at occupying Ukraine. Kryukova emphasized that “during the heyday of the princes of Kyiv, the territory of Muscovy was covered with swamps and wild forests.” In addition, she noted the danger of successful Ukraine to present-day Moscow.

Svitlana Kryukova's assessment of Putin's article caused a wide public response. The pro-Ukrainian part of the audience supported the journalist, while the Russian-oriented audience and opinion leaders sharply criticized her, including Olha Shariy, wife of pro-Russian propagandist Anatoliy Shariy and showman Vladimir Bystryakov. Kryukova was accused of betraying the ideals of the “Russian world” and suspected of having secret ties with the Office of the President of Ukraine. The journalist herself denied any accusations. There were also suggestions that this post might be part of the arrangement between Bankova and the chief editor of Strana.ua, Ihor Huzhva, the result of which would be the return of the latter to Ukraine. Ihor Huzhva was forced to respond, saying that he “disagreed with the statements of his subordinate, but he would not fire her”, noting that “she had always had this point of view on Putin”.

Recognition 

Svitlana Kryukova ranks 42nd in the rating of the 100 most influential women in Ukraine according to Focus magazine.

In 2010, she took second place in the “Banks, Finance, Investments” category of the PRESSzvanie award.

Paintings 

Svitlana Kryukova is also known as the author of paintings in the style of art ecstasy and in the genre of political satire with mocking stories that mock episodes in Ukrainian politics.

In 2018, she launched a series of public auctions on Facebook to sell her paintings. The auctions gained popularity due to her paintings Lyzoblyud, which depicts a man licking a plate and looks similar to Verkhovna Rada deputy Anton Herashchenko. Svitlana Kryukova created and auctioned five paintings, which were bought up by famous people — lawyers, businessmen, and politicians.

Later, other scandalous works were sold at auction. In particular, Kryukova sold her painting Resurrection, which depicts a man resembling Russian journalist Arkady Babchenko. The plot mocks the staged murder of Babchenko, when he was found murdered in his apartment, but it later turned out that he was alive, and the "murder" was an  Security Service of Ukraine special operation carried out to identify the real potential killers of Babchenko.

A little later, Kryukova sold her painting Petr and the Maldives for $5,000. The painting, mocking the Ukrainian president's secret summer vacation, depicts a naked man with a face similar to that of incumbent President Petro Poroshenko, surrounded by angels and a "bird's milk" candy in his hand.

Also, at one time, a painting called Hugging by Svetlana Kryukova was put up for auction. The painting depicts kissing men who look like the fifth President of Ukraine, Petro Poroshenko, and the Russian president, Vladimir Putin.

On Kharkiv City Day, August 23, 2021, a painting depicting the late mayor Hennadiy Kernes in front of the zoo was sold for a record-breaking $12,500.

Also, at one time, Ihor Kolomoyskyi, Oleksandr Hranovskyi, Oleh Liashko, Ihor Mosiychuk, Oleksandr Dubinskyi, Viktor Medvedchuk, Illia Kyva, Mykola Tyshchenko and others became heroes of Kryukova's paintings.

Books 

 Diary of Euromaidan. – Kyiv : Summit Book, 2014. – 184 pages
 Revolution through the Eyes of Reporter's Journalists, and Chronicles of the Revolution. — Kyiv : Summit Book, 2015. — 240 pages
 Setka. — Kyiv : Brand Bookf Publishing. 2019. — 244 pages

References 

Living people
1984 births
People from Kyiv
21st-century Ukrainian journalists
Ukrainian women journalists